Edwin E. Aguilar (August 16, 1974 – April 10, 2021) was Salvadoran-American animator and storyboard artist on The Simpsons from 1999 to 2021. He studied illustration at the ArtCenter College of Design in Pasadena and animation at the Bridges Visual Institute in Santa Monica. He worked in Graz Entertainment  and Hanna-Barbera. Aguilar died of a stroke in April 2021. The final Simpsons episode that Aguilar assistant directed is "Burger Kings". The following episode, "Panic on the Streets of Springfield", was dedicated to him.

References

External links 

1974 births
2021 deaths
The Simpsons
Salvadoran emigrants to the United States
Art Center College of Design alumni
Hanna-Barbera people
People from San Salvador
Hispanic and Latino American artists